Janakan is a 2010 Indian Malayalam-language crime thriller film directed by N. R. Sanjeev and written by S. N. Swami, starring Suresh Gopi and Mohanlal. The music was composed by M. Jayachandran. It was released on 8 April 2010 in Kerala and was distributed by Maxlab Entertainments. Janakan is credited as the 200th film appearance of Suresh Gopi. The film won the Kerala state Film Award for Best playback singer - Female for Rajalakshmy for the song "Olichirunne".

Plot 

Vishwam, a man who has murdered three monsters who raped his only daughter Seetha / Anu, a college-going girl. Anu is raped by her boyfriend and his uncles after he cheats her and forces her to home. She is raped for a few days and killed.

Suryanarayanan, an advocate who comes to the Viswam's rescue. Surya is one of the best lawyers in the country and is known to have a way with words. Suryanarayanan takes it upon himself to release Vishwam from the clutches of the judiciary, because he is convinced of the man's justice.

Monai and Pazhani are Vishwam's accomplices, who accompany him to visit Suryanarayanan. The rest of the story is how Suryanarayanan saves Viswam and his friends from punishment.

Cast

Production 
Director N. R. Sanjeev, also known as Saji Paravoor, had previously worked on movies like Mazha (2000), Makante Achan (2009), Sethurama Iyer CBI (2004), Mahasamudram, Nerariyan CBI (2005) and Yes Your Honour (2006), and had assisted several well-known directors. The script was written by S. N. Swami, known for his thriller screenplays. Sajeev Shanker was the cinematographer and editing was done by B. Murali. The music was composed by music director M. Jayachandran and lyrics were by Gireesh Puthenchery. Mahadevan Thampi was the still photographer of this movie.

Janakan was filmed in Thiruvananthapuram and surrounding areas in Kerala.

Soundtrack
Music for the film was composed by M. Jayachandran with lyrics by Gireesh Puthenchery. The film contains one song "Olichirunne" sung by Rajalakshmy. The soundtrack album was released by Satyam Audios.

 "Olichirunne", Rajalakshmy – 4:06

Release 
The movie was released on 8 April 2010.

Reception
Sify.com gave a "watchable" verdict and said "There are no real experiments here, true, but the film has its moments and as they say, the heart at the right place. Though the film is just above two hours, it could have been more enjoyable, if it was shorter by some 20 minutes or so". Indiaglitz.com stated it "above average" and added "With a relevant message and above average narratives, 'Janakan' may find needed audiences, to end up as a safer movie at the Box Office.". Paresh C Palicha of Rediff.com rated 2.5 out of 5 and said "Janakan is promising. In short, this film heavily depends on the actors to pull it off after the initial excitement dies down. So, Mohanlal has to use his aura to the maximum which he does, making his fans happy. Suresh Gopi in the subdued rustic role wins hands down. Biju Menon and Harisree Asokan are mostly mute supporters. It is pleasantly surprising to see Harisree not in a separate comic track. Jyothirmayi, in the meaty role of Dr Rani Mathew, does well.". Ibnlive.in.com rated 2.5 out of 5 and concluded "Director Sanjeev has tried to give a new angle to a story that's already been told several times, but he has failed to use class actors Mohanlal, Suresh Gopi and Biju Menon up to their potential. A watchable movie, if you don't expect much!". Nowrunning.com gave an average rating of 2 out of 5 and said "Janakan tells a new age story that's already been told. There is no denying the societal renovation that it aims at, but perhaps it needed to reinvent its modes of delivery.".

Box office
The film was a moderate success at the box office.

Awards
 Kerala State Film Award for Best Female Playback Singer - Rajalakshmy
 Kerala Film Critics Association Award for Best Popular Film

References

External links 
 

2010 films
2010s Malayalam-language films
Indian crime thriller films
Indian rape and revenge films
Films about rape in India
Fictional portrayals of the Kerala Police
Films shot in Thiruvananthapuram
Films scored by M. Jayachandran